An accessory muscle is a relatively rare anatomical variation where duplication of a muscle may appear anywhere in the muscular system. Treatment is not indicated unless the accessory muscle interferes with normal function. Examples are the sternalis muscle, accessory soleus muscle, extensor digitorum brevis manus and epitrochleoanconeus muscle.

An accessory muscle can also refer to a muscle that is not primarily responsible for movement but does provide assistance. Examples of such muscles are the accessory muscles of respiration where the sternocleidomastoid and the scalene muscles (anterior, middle and posterior scalene) are typically considered accessory muscles of respiration.

See also
 Accessory bone
 List of muscles of the human body

References

 
Muscular system